A soft box is a type of photographic lighting device, one of a number of photographic soft light devices. All the various soft light types create even and diffused light by transmitting light through some scattering material, or by reflecting light off a second surface to diffuse the light. The best known form of reflective source is the umbrella light, where the light from the bulb is "bounced" off the inside of a metalized umbrella to create an indirect "soft" light.

A soft box is an enclosure around a bulb comprising reflective side and back walls and a diffusing material at the front of the light.  

The sides and back of the box are lined with a bright surface - an aluminized fabric surface or an aluminum foil, to act as an efficient reflector. In some commercially available models the diffuser is removable to allow the light to be used alone as a floodlight or with an umbrella reflector. 

A soft box can be used with either flash or continuous light sources such as fluorescent lamps or "hot lights" such as quartz halogen bulbs or tungsten bulbs. If soft box lights are used with "hot" light sources, the photographer must be sure the soft box is heat rated for the wattage of the light to which it is attached in order to avoid fire hazard.

Types of softbox

See also
 Beauty dish
 Light tent
 Reflector (photography)
 Speed ring
 Striplight

References

Photography equipment
Photographic lighting